(literally, "five-point fort") is a star fort in the Japanese city of Hakodate on the island of Hokkaido. The fortress was completed in 1866. It was the main fortress of the short-lived Republic of Ezo.

History
Goryōkaku was designed in 1855 by Takeda Ayasaburō. His plan was based on the work of the French architect Sébastien Le Prestre de Vauban. The fortress was completed in 1866, two years before the collapse of the Tokugawa shogunate. It is shaped like a five-pointed star. This allowed for greater numbers of gun emplacements on its walls than a traditional Japanese fortress, and reduced the number of blind spots where a cannon could not fire.

The fort was built by the Tokugawa shogunate to protect Tsugaru Strait against a possible invasion by the Russian fleet. It became the capital of the Republic of Ezo, a state that existed only in 1869. It was the site of the last battle of the Boshin War between the Republic and the Empire of Japan. The fighting lasted for a week (June 20–27, 1869).

Park
Today, Goryōkaku is a park declared as a Special Historical Site, being a part of the Hakodate city museum and a citizens' favorite spot for cherry-blossom viewing in spring.

See also
List of Special Places of Scenic Beauty, Special Historic Sites and Special Natural Monuments
Benten Daiba, another key fortress of the Republic of Ezo
Citadel Hill, a similar shaped fortress in Nova Scotia, Canada
Fort Bourtange, a similarly-shaped fortress in the Netherlands.
List of foreign-style castles in Japan
Palmanova

References

Further reading

External links

Japan Atlas: Goryokaku Fort
Sightseeing in Hakodate: Goryokaku Area
Goryokaku Tower

Forts in Japan
Boshin War
Special Historic Sites
Buildings and structures in Hakodate
Coastal fortifications
Star forts
19th-century fortifications in Japan
Hanami spots of Japan
Tourist attractions in Hakodate